Viola Brand (born 28 June 1994) is a German cyclist specialising in artistic cycling. She has won national and European championships twice each, and the silver medal three times in the World Championships.

Personal life
Brand was born in Backnang, Germany. She tried to climb the training bike as early as 5 years old, then still failing to reach the pedals. Her elder brother did artistic cycling before her, and both he and Brand were coached by their mother. She started training artistic cycling at 6 years old.

Brand is studying clinical nutrition at Hohenheim University, Stuttgart. , she is writing the thesis for her master's degree.

Professional career

Brand's sports club is RSV Unterweissach (located in Weissach im Tal).
She joined the German national sports team at the age of 15, and won the Junior European Championships in 2012.

She set a world record at the European Junior Championships in 2011 in her age group, and another world record at the regular European Championships in 2018. Her best personal score was 194.71 points in German Masters 2019.

Brand spent years perfecting her choreography and learning new stunts. It took her seven years of training to be able to do a handstand on the handlebar, the stunt Brand is most proud of, and in June 2019 she was able to perform a Maute jump for the first time, jumping from the saddle to the handlebars.

Brand participated in a total of five World Championships, missing qualification in 2018 after a competition which German national coach  called "very hard". Since each nation can only send two participants, Brand stated that "qualification is much harder than winning a medal at the World Championships".

Her last official competition was in Basel at the World Championships in December 2019, where she won a silver medal, making it her third Vice Championship. In February 2020 she announced her retirement, although she continues to perform for exhibitions and to promote her sport. Brand hopes to someday see artistic cycling become one of the Olympic sports.

Statistics

Personal best
Her best results, according to data from the Union Cycliste Internationale (UCI) and German Cycling Federation (BDR):

Other activities

In 2017, Brand started an Instagram account after a friend suggested it, and by July 2018 had gathered over 100k followers. , she has almost 400k followers. Her channel piqued the interest of staff from The Ellen DeGeneres Show, which Brand used to watch to improve her English skills, and in February 2020 she was a guest in the show. In 2018, she participated in the talent show Das Supertalent but failed to reach the final. In 2019, she toured with the show  through 22 cities in Germany, with her performance being lauded.

After her February 2020 retirement from professional sports, Brand announced that she would like to focus on appearances in shows and her social media.
In early 2021, she signed a contract with the Golden State Warriors to perform during the halftime show, virtually at first due to the ongoing COVID-19 pandemic; in early 2022 she performed live during several NBA halftime shows. In July 2021, the Stuttgarter Zeitung reported on an underwater photography session featuring Brand with her bicycle. In May 2022, she was featured in a video by Danny MacAskill.

References

External links 

Brand, Viola
1994 births
Living people
People from Backnang
Sportspeople from Stuttgart (region)
Cyclists from Baden-Württemberg
20th-century German women
21st-century German women